All Around My Hat is a 1975 album by Steeleye Span, their eighth and highest-charting; it reached number 7 on the UK Albums Chart, and stayed on the chart for six months. It was produced by Mike Batt, who also produced their follow-up album Rocket Cottage. It briefly made the band a household name in the UK. In the United States it became the band's first album to chart, reaching number 143.

The title track was edited to just over three minutes long for single release and became their highest-charting single, reaching No. 5 on the UK Singles Chart, with "Black Jack Davy" as its B-side.

In 1976 an edited version of a second track from the album, "Hard Times of Old England", was issued as a single, but did not chart.

The song "Dance with Me" is a version of a Scandinavian ballad, "Herr Olof och Älvorna".

The album cover and back was designed by John O'Connor, a friend of the band's guitarist Tim Hart, using an anamorphic projection that distorted the facial features of the band members but which looks correct when viewed from the side through special pinholes in the lyric sheet.

Versions
The record label Mobile Fidelity Sound Labs reissued this LP in 1980 in a half-speed-mastered, Japan-pressed, limited-edition audiophile vinyl edition, as catalog number MFSL 1-027.

Track listing
All tracks Traditional, arranged by Hart/Prior/Knight/Johnson/Kemp.
"Black Jack Davy"
"Hard Times of Old England"
"Cadgwith Anthem"
"Sum Waves"
"The Wife of Ushers Well"
"Gamble Gold (Robin Hood)"
"All Around My Hat"
"Dance With Me"
"Batchelors Hall"

Personnel
Steeleye Span
Maddy Prior - vocals
Tim Hart - guitar, vocals, dulcimer
Bob Johnson - guitar, vocals
Rick Kemp - bass guitar, vocals
Peter Knight - violin, vocals, mandolin
Nigel Pegrum - drums, flute

Cover version
In 1996, one of the group's lead vocalists, Maddy Prior, contributed guest vocals to a Status Quo recording of the song "All Around My Hat", and when that band toured England that year with Steeleye Span as support, she joined them on stage to sing it as an encore. Released as a single, it reached No. 47.

References

1975 albums
Chrysalis Records albums
Steeleye Span albums
Albums produced by Mike Batt